Patrick S. Moore (born October 21, 1956) is an Irish and American virologist and epidemiologist who co-discovered together with his wife, Yuan Chang, two different human viruses causing the AIDS-related cancer Kaposi's sarcoma and the skin cancer Merkel cell carcinoma.  The couple met while in medical school together and were married in 1989 while they pursued fellowships at different universities.

Education and career
Moore received a Bachelor of Science in chemistry and biology from Westminster College in Salt Lake City, an M.S. degree from Stanford University, and M.D. and MPhil degrees from the University of Utah, and an M.P.H. degree from the University of California, Berkeley.  As an epidemiologist working at the US Centers for Disease Control and Prevention (CDC), he developed widely used international guidelines to control meningococcal meningitis epidemics and led a team of CDC epidemiologists during the 1992 Somali Civil War.  Civilian death rates documented during this civil war-famine were among the highest ever reported.  The extreme mortality statistics helped to solidify international support behind the US-led military intervention Operation Restore Hope. He received the CDC Langmuir Prize for his work on epidemic meningitis control.

After leaving the CDC, Moore served briefly as a New York City epidemiologist but quit to search for new human viruses with his wife, Yuan Chang who was then a newly appointed assistant professor at Columbia University. Unemployed, he worked in his wife's laboratory, allowing him to rapidly pick up training in molecular biology.  Despite having no research funding, Moore and Chang used a new molecular biology technique, representational difference analysis, to search for a virus causing Kaposi's sarcoma, the most common malignancy among AIDS patients.  In 1994, they discovered a new human herpesvirus, KSHV, in a KS tumor and along with several collaborators showed that it was the etiologic agent of Kaposi's sarcoma, primary effusion lymphoma, and multicentric Castleman's disease.  Moore was hired onto the faculty at Columbia and the Chang-Moore Laboratory secured research funding to investigate this new virus.  They subsequently sequenced KSHV, identified oncogenes encoded by the virus, demonstrated transmission during transplantation and developed diagnostic tests to detect infection.  His laboratory currently seeks to understand the role of tumor virus immunoevasion of the innate immune system as a cause for viral tumorigenesis.  In 2002, he moved his laboratory to the University of Pittsburgh where he is the director of the Molecular Virology Program at the UPMC Hillman Cancer Center.  Chang and Moore jointly developed a new technique to find human tumor viruses called digital transcriptome subtraction (DTS).  Using this approach, they identified the most recently discovered human polyomavirus infecting Merkel cells. This virus is the likely cause of Merkel-cell carcinoma and hence is named Merkel cell polyomavirus. Moore and Chang have discovered two of the seven known human viruses causing cancer.

Awards
Moore and Chang have been awarded the 1997  Meyenburg Cancer Research Prize, 1998 Robert Koch Prize, the 2003 General Motors Cancer Research Foundation Charles S. Mott Prize, the 2017 Paul Ehrlich and Ludwig Darmstaedter Prize and the 2017 Passano Award.  They are 2017 Clarivate Citation Laureates.

References

Further reading

External links
 Chang-Moore laboratory website

Living people
American medical researchers
American people of Irish descent
American epidemiologists
American virologists
1956 births
Westminster College (Utah) alumni
University of Utah School of Medicine alumni
Stanford University alumni
University of California, Berkeley alumni
University of Pittsburgh faculty